Bowling Green High School is a public high school in Bowling Green, Kentucky, United States. It is a part of the Bowling Green Independent School District. The school's teams are called the purples and the school's colors are purple, gold, and white.

History
Both Bowling Green High School and Louisville Male, another high school located in Louisville, Kentucky, were seeking the same education objectives. In aftermath, both schools agreed to work in unison and have the same school colors, the “purples” mascot, and the “H” to symbolize their schools. Louisville Male would later go on to change their mascot, but Bowling Green High School remained the purples.

The school has recently started upgrading with a renovation project that began in May 2018 with a groundbreaking. Phase I was completed in 2020. Phase I included the construction of 80% of the classrooms of the current facility, with  built. In 2020 the Bowling Green Independent School District Finance Corp. issued $17 million bonds for the second phase of renovations to ensure a source of funding for them. In June 2020 the second phase was to begin. The new building was to be built around the original swimming pool, which was to be demolished in Phase II and replaced with another pool. The former pool was called the "Dome of Champions", and it closed on March 15, 2021. In October 2021 the current swimming pool is to open. In 2021 the district proceeded with the fourth phase, and the remainder of the former facility is to be razed. The students and staff expect to be completely in the new building by the Spring of 2022.

References

External links
 Bowling Green High School

Public high schools in Kentucky
Buildings and structures in Bowling Green, Kentucky
Schools in Warren County, Kentucky